John Benjamin Barber (6 February 1849 – 21 February 1908) was an English cricketer who played three first-class matches for Lancashire County Cricket Club between 1874 and 1876.

References

1849 births
1908 deaths
English cricketers
Lancashire cricketers
People from Stretford